The 2015–16 New Orleans Privateers men's basketball team represented the University of New Orleans during the 2015–16 NCAA Division I men's basketball season. The Privateers were led by fifth year head coach Mark Slessinger and played their home games at Lakefront Arena. They were members of the Southland Conference. They finished the season 10–20, 6–12 to finish in a three-way tie for ninth place Southland play. They lost to Southeastern Louisiana in the first round of the Southland tournament.

Preseason 
The Privateers were picked to finish eighth (8th) in the Southland Conference Coaches' Poll and tenth (10th) in the Sports Information Directors Poll.

Roster

Schedule
Source

|-
!colspan=9 style="background:#003399; color:#C0C0C0;"| Out of Conference

|-
!colspan=9 style="background:#003399; color:#C0C0C0;"| Conference Games

|-
!colspan=9 style="background:#003399; color:#C0C0C0;"| Southland tournament

See also
2015–16 New Orleans Privateers women's basketball team

References

New Orleans Privateers men's basketball seasons
New Orleans
2015 in sports in Louisiana
2016 in sports in Louisiana